Pectus may refer to:
 the part of the torso between the neck and the diaphragm
 colloquially, the word is also used for certain deformations of the pectus such as:
 Pectus excavatum, an abnormally concave chest
 Pectus carinatum, an abnormally convex chest

See also
 Pectis, a genus of flowering plants in the daisy family